

66001–66100 

|-bgcolor=#f2f2f2
| colspan=4 align=center | 
|}

66101–66200 

|-id=151
| 66151 Josefhanuš || 1998 UL || Josef Hanuš (born 1983) is a Czech planetary astronomer. He has worked on modeling rotation states and shapes of small Solar System bodies using the technique of rotation lightcurve inversion, and on their physical modeling using also infrared observations, stellar occultation data and adaptive optics observations. || 
|}

66201–66300 

|-id=207
| 66207 Carpi ||  || Carpi, a town in northern Italy, is known worldwide for its textile (especially knitwear) manufacturing and mechanical (especially woodworking) machinery. || 
|}

66301–66400 

|-id=391
| 66391 Moshup ||  || Moshup was a giant who lived in the coastal areas of New England, according to Native American legends, and was responsible for a variety of geologic features. As a way of maintaining balance, he married Granny Squannit, a leader of the Makiawasug, or Little People, who lived nearby. Squannit was a medicine woman of the Makiawasug who married the giant Moshup. Bad weather was attributed to times when the pair would argue. Moshup is the name of the primary, Squannit that for the satellite. || 
|}

66401–66500 

|-id=454
| 66454 Terezabeatriz || 1999 PM || Tereza Beatriz Braga (1948–2016) was a psychologist, psychopedagogue and Brazilian teacher, and wife of the amateur astronomer Joo Ribeiro de Barros. She sponsored the SONEAR Observatory (Oliveira-MG). A lover of the stars, she did much to spread astronomy among schoolchildren. || 
|-id=458
| 66458 Romaplanetario ||  || The planetarium in Rome, where the discoverer, Gianluca Masi, introduced visitors to the wonders of the Universe. A new planetarium opened in 2004, replacing the older one which closed in 1984. || 
|-id=479
| 66479 Healy ||  || David H. Healy (1936–2011), American astrophotographer and discoverer of minor planets, an original contributor to Burnham's Celestial handbook. He established the Junk Bond Observatory in Arizona, known for visual work and recoveries of minor planets. The observatory has been the site of over 60 new discoveries. || 
|}

66501–66600 

|-id=583
| 66583 Nicandra ||  || Nicandra is a genus of flowering plants in the nightshade family containing the single species Nicandra physalodes. While the genus is named for Greek poet Nicander, it is known by the common names "apple-of-Peru" and "shoo-fly plant." Its flowers are bell-shaped, pale violet with white throats. || 
|}

66601–66700 

|-id=652
| 66652 Borasisi ||  || Along with its moon, Pabu, the mythical personifications of the Sun (Borasisi) and Moon (Pabu) in the fictional cosmogony of "Bokononism" described in Kurt Vonnegut's Cat's Cradle || 
|-id=661
| 66661 Wallin ||  || John F. Wallin (born 1961), an American astrophysicist at George Mason University, Virginia. He is an educator and researcher of stellar formation, galactic dynamics and the presence and effects of non-baryonic matter in the Solar System. || 
|-id=667
| 66667 Kambič ||  || Bojan Kambič (born 1959), Slovenian founder and editor of the astronomical magazine Spika, regularly published since 1993. Spika greatly influenced the Slovenian astronomical community, boosted various astronomical activities and thoroughly changed the face of astronomy in Slovenia. || 
|-id=669
| 66669 Aradac ||  || The Serbian village of Aradac located in the Autonomous Province of Vojvodina, where Slovaks have been living in close fraternal ties with Serbs for centuries || 
|-id=671
| 66671 Sfasu ||  || Stephen F. Austin State University (the minor planet was discovered at the university's observatory) || 
|}

66701–66800 

|-bgcolor=#f2f2f2
| colspan=4 align=center | 
|}

66801–66900 

|-id=843
| 66843 Pulido || 1999 VG || Alfonso Pulido (born 1945), Spanish astronomical computer programmer, developer of the Elbrus software used by amateur and professional astronomers around the globe to derive the center of configurations of stars for use in high-precision telescope control. || 
|-id=846
| 66846 Franklederer ||  || Louis Franklin Lederer (1935–2009) was a director of Instrumentation Specialties Co. in Lincoln, Nebraska, and an inventor who was granted patents in 1975 and 1976 for devices measuring flow rates and air and water quality. These devices are now commonly used in the U.S., Canada and Europe. || 
|-id=856
| 66856 Stephenvoss ||  || Stephen Voss (born 1966) is a New Zealand-born general physician and noted amateur astronomer and astrophotographer. He founded the Aurora Australis Facebook page. || 
|}

66901–67000 

|-id=934
| 66934 Kálalová ||  || Vlasta Kálalová (1896–1971), a Czech physician, interested in tropical diseases and entomology, came from the southern Bohemian town of Bernartice. In 1925, she founded the Mustausaf Czechoslovak hospital in Baghdad, Iraq, with a special focus on health services for women. || 
|-id=939
| 66939 Franscini ||  || Stefano Franscini (1796–1857), Swiss politician and statistician. He was one of the initial members of the Swiss Federal Council elected in 1848 and Switzerland's first native Italian speaking federal councillor. || 
|}

References 

066001-067000